The Col de la Cluse is a mountain pass located 1,169 m above sea level in the Chartreuse Mountains. It connects Le Désert d'Entremont (commune of Entremont-le-Vieux) to Corbel, Savoie, France.  The main road of the pass is the D45.

In winter, It is a departure to the cross country ski slopes. In summer, it is the start of a two-hour hike to access to Roche Veyrand (1,429 m), overlooking Saint-Pierre d'Entremont in Savoie. The nearby Roc de Gleisin can also be reached. It is one of the access roads to the Col du Grapillon, to the east.

References 

Mountain passes of Auvergne-Rhône-Alpes
Mountain passes of the Alps